Naim Antaki  (Arabic: نعيم أنطاكي) (1971 - 1903),  was a Syrian politician who served as foreign minister and finance minister of Syria in 1940s.

Background 
He was born in Aleppo in 1903 to a wealthy family.  he studied law at American University of Beirut and University of Paris.

Career 
He joined the National coalition in 1932 and served as minister of foreign affairs twice and minister of finance once in 1940s.

References 

Members of the People's Assembly of Syria
People from Aleppo
20th-century Syrian politicians
Greek Orthodox Christians from Syria
Syrian ministers of finance
Foreign ministers of Syria
1903 births
1971 deaths
Syrian Christians